"Jacky's Only Happy When She's Up on the Stage" is a song by English singer-songwriter Morrissey. It was produced by Joe Chiccarelli. The song was released via BMG Rights Management on 17 November 2017 as the second single from Morrissey's eleventh solo studio album, Low in High School (2017). A 7" vinyl single was released on 8 December 2017, featuring an Elvis Presley cover on the B-side.

The cover features a 1983 photo by Miron Zownir.

It reached number one on the UK Vinyl Singles Chart, where it remained for two weeks, including the Christmas number one week of 2017. When Morrissey performed the song on a BBC television show, he changed the lyrics "exit, exit" to "Brexit, exit".

Music video
The video was directed by Robert Hales and features Morrissey and his band doing a dance routine.

Track listing
Digital download
 "Jacky's Only Happy When She's Up on the Stage" – 4:19

7" vinyl
 "Jacky's Only Happy When She's Up on the Stage" – 4:19
 "You'll Be Gone" (live)

References

External links
 

2017 songs
2017 singles
Morrissey songs
Songs written by Boz Boorer
Songs written by Morrissey
BMG Rights Management singles